Sima Biao (between 238 and 246 – 306), style name Shaotong, was an historian and nobleman during the Jin dynasty of China.

Biography
Sima Biao was the eldest son of Sima Mu (司馬睦), Prince of Gaoyang. His grandfather was Sima Jin, younger brother of Sima Yi. This made Sima Biao one of many second-cousins to the emperors who reigned during his lifetime. Although the eldest son, Sima Biao was disinherited by his father due to his self-effacing nature and love of sex, pushing him onto a scholarly career path.

Appointed to minor sinecures, he began to work on literature and history, annotating the Zhuangzi and the Huainanzi, and writing the Chronicles of the Nine States.  Lamenting the absence of a coherent history of the Eastern Han, Sima Biao began collating various sources into what would become his greatest work, the Continuation of the Book of Han, covering the two hundred years from Emperor Guangwu of Han to Emperor Xian of Han. He also edited Qiao Zhou's Examination of Ancient History, altering over two hundred events so they would comply with the Bamboo Annals.

Works
Sima Biao's Continuation of the Book of Han was one of many attempts during the Jin dynasty to create a history of the Eastern Han. Like most traditional Chinese histories, his book was arranged into annals and biographies, along with eight treatises, and ran to a total length of 80 fascicles. Of these, all have been lost but the five volumes of treatises, on the topics of the calendar, ceremony, rituals, astronomy, the five phases, geography, bureaucracy, vehicles, and clothing. These have been incorporated into Fan Ye's Book of the Later Han, and Sima Biao is sometimes credited as a coauthor on that work.

Titles and appointments held
 Commandant of Cavalry
 Assistant in the Palace Library
 Vice Director of the Palace Library
 Gentleman Cavalier Attendant

Family
Great-grandfather: Sima Fang
Grandfather: Sima Jin
Father: Sima Mu

Notes

References
 

3rd-century Chinese historians
306 deaths
Jin dynasty (266–420) historians
Year of birth uncertain